A rapier or  is a type of sword with a slender and sharply pointed two-edged blade that was popular in Western Europe, both for civilian use (dueling and self-defense) and as a military side arm, throughout the 16th and 17th centuries.

Important sources for rapier fencing include the Italian Bolognese group, with early representatives such as Antonio Manciolino and Achille Marozzo publishing in the 1530s, and reaching the peak of its popularity with writers of the early 1600s (Salvator Fabris, Ridolfo Capo Ferro).
The best known treatise of this tradition was published in French, by Girard Thibault, in 1630.

The French small sword or court sword of the 18th century was a direct continuation of this tradition of fencing, adapted specifically for dueling.

Rapier fencing forms part of Historical European Martial Arts.

Terminology
The term rapier comes from the french term "rapière" and appears both in English and German, near-simultaneously, in the mid-16th century, for a light, long, pointed two-edged sword. It is a loan from Middle French espee rapiere, first recorded in 1474, a nickname meaning "grater". The origin of the rapier shape is more than likely Spanish. Its name is a "derisive" description of the Spanish term "ropera". The Spanish term refers to a sword used with clothes ("espada ropera", dress sword), due to it being used as an accessory for clothing, usually for fashion and as a self-defense weapon. The 16th-century German rappier described what was considered a "foreign" weapon, imported from Italy, Spain or France. Du Cange in his Middle Latin dictionary cites a form Rapperia from a Latin text of 1511. He envisages a derivation from Greek ραπίζειν "to strike." Adelung in his 1798 dictionary records a double meaning for the German verb rappieren: "to fence with rapiers" on one hand, and "to rasp, grate (specifically of tobacco leaves)" on the other.

The terms used by the Italian, Spanish and French masters during the heyday of this weapon were simply the equivalent of "sword", i.e. spada, espada, and épée (espée). When it was necessary to specify the type of sword, Spanish used espada ropera ("dress sword", recorded 1468), and Italian used spada da lato "side-sword" or spada da lato a striscia (in modern Italian simply striscia "strip"), sometimes also called Stocco.The Spanish name was registered for the first time in las Coplas de la panadera, by Juan de Mena, written between 1445 and 1450 approximately.

Clements (1997) categorizes thrusting swords with poor cutting abilities as rapiers, and swords with both good thrusting and cutting abilities as cut-and-thrust swords. 

The term "rapier" is also applied by archaeologists to an unrelated type of Bronze Age sword.

Description 

The word "rapier" generally refers to a relatively long-bladed sword characterized by a protective hilt which is constructed to provide protection for the hand wielding the sword. Some historical rapier samples also feature a broad blade mounted on a typical rapier hilt. The term rapier can be confusing because this hybrid weapon can be categorized as a type of broadsword. While the rapier blade might be broad enough to cut to some degree (but nowhere near that of the wider swords in use around the Middle Ages such as the longsword), it is designed to perform quick and nimble thrusting attacks. The blade might be sharpened along its entire length or sharpened only from the center to the tip (as described by Capoferro). Pallavicini, a rapier master in 1670, strongly advocated using a weapon with two cutting edges.

The term rapier generally refers to a thrusting sword with a blade longer and thinner than that of the so-called side-sword but much heavier than the small sword, a lighter weapon that would follow in the 18th century and later, but the exact form of the blade and hilt often depends on who is writing and when. It can refer to earlier spada da lato and the similar espada ropera, through the high rapier period of the 17th century through the small sword and duelling swords; thus context is important in understanding what is meant by the word. (The term side-sword, used among some modern historical martial arts reconstructionists, is a translation from the Italian spada da lato—a term coined long after the fact by Italian museum curators—and does not refer to the slender, long rapier, but only to the early 16th-century Italian sword with a broader and shorter blade that is considered both its ancestor and contemporary.)

Parts of the sword

Hilt 
Rapiers often have complex, sweeping hilts designed to protect the hand wielding the sword. Rings extend forward from the crosspiece. In some later samples, rings are covered with metal plates, eventually evolving into the cup hilts of many later rapiers. There were hardly any samples that featured plates covering the rings prior to the 1600s. Many hilts include a knuckle bow extending down from the crosspiece protecting the grip, which was usually wood wrapped with cord, leather or wire. A large pommel (often decorated) secures the hilt to the weapon and provides some weight to balance the long blade.

Blade 
Various rapier masters divided the blade into two, three, four, five or even nine parts. The forte, strong, is that part of the blade closest to the hilt; in cases where a master divides the blade into an even number of parts, this is the first half of the blade. The debole, weak, is the part of the blade which includes the point and is the second half of the blade when the sword is divided into an even number of parts. However, some rapier masters divided the blade into three parts (or even a multiple of three), in which case the central third of the blade, between the forte and the debole, was often called the medio, mezzo or the terzo. Others used four divisions (Fabris) or even 12 (Thibault).

The ricasso is the rear portion of the blade, usually unsharpened. It extends forward from the crosspiece or quillion and then gradually integrates into the thinner and sharper portion of the blade.

Overall length 
There was historical disagreement over how long the ideal rapier should be, with some masters, such as Thibault, denigrating those who recommended longer blades; Thibault's own recommended length was such that the cross of the sword be level with the navel (belly button) when standing naturally with the point resting on the ground. A small number of rapiers with extending blades were made with 4 surviving in modern collections. The purpose of the ability is unclear, with suggestions including trying to gain the advantage of surprise in a duel or an attempt to get around laws limiting weapon length.

Off-hand weapons 

Rapiers are single-handed weapons and they were often employed with off-hand bucklers, daggers, cloaks and even second swords to assist with defense. A buckler is a small round shield that was used with other blades as well, such as the arming sword. In Capo Ferro's Gran Simulacro, the treatise depicts how to use the weapon with the rotella, which is a significantly bigger shield compared with the buckler. Nevertheless, using rapier with its parrying dagger is the most common practice, and it has been arguably considered as the most suited and effective accompanying weapon for the rapier. Even though the slender blade of rapier enables the user to launch quick attack at a fairly long and advantaged distance between the user and the opponent and the protective hilt can deflect the opponent's blade when he or she uses rapier as well, the thrust-oriented weapon is weakened by its bated cutting power and relatively low maneuverability at a closer distance, where the opponent has safely passed the reach of the rapier's deadly point. Because of such insufficient cutting power and maneuverability at this situation when the opponent passes the deadly point, this scenario leaves opening for the opponent to attack the user. Therefore, some close-range protection for the user needs to be ensured if the user intends to use the rapier in an optimal way, especially when the opponent uses some slash-oriented sword like a sabre or a broadsword. A parrying dagger not only enables the users to defend in this scenario in which the rapier is not very good at protecting the user, but also enables them to attack in such close distance.

History 

The espada ropera of the 16th century was a cut-and-thrust civilian weapon for self-defense and the duel, while earlier weapons were equally at home on the battlefield. Throughout the 16th century, a variety of new, single-handed civilian weapons were being developed. In 1570 the Italian master Rocco Bonetti first settled in England advocating the use of the rapier for thrusting as opposed to cutting or slashing when engaged in a duel. Nevertheless, the English word "rapier" generally refers to a primarily thrusting weapon, developed by the year 1600 as a result of the geometrical theories of such masters as Camillo Agrippa, Ridolfo Capoferro and Vincentio Saviolo.

The rapier became extremely fashionable throughout Europe with the wealthier classes, but was not without its detractors. Some people, such as George Silver, disapproved of its technical potential and the dueling use to which it was put.

Allowing for fast reactions, and with a long reach, the rapier was well suited to civilian combat in the 16th and 17th centuries. As military-style cutting and thrusting swords continued to evolve to meet needs on the battlefield, the rapier continued to evolve to meet the needs of civilian combat and decorum, eventually becoming lighter, shorter and less cumbersome to wear. This is when the rapier began to give way to the colichemarde, which was itself later superseded by the small sword which was later superseded by the épée. Noticeably, there were some "war rapiers" that feature a relatively wide blade mounted on a typical rapier hilt during this era. These hybrid swords were used in the military or even in battlefield. Gustav II Adolf carried a sword that was used in the Thirty Years' War and is a typical example of the "war rapier".

By the year 1715, the rapier had been largely replaced by the lighter small sword throughout most of Europe, although the former continued to be used, as evidenced by the treatises of Donald McBane (1728), P. J. F. Girard (1736) and Domenico Angelo (1787). The rapier is still used today by officers of the Swiss Guard of the pope.

Historical schools of rapier fencing

Italy 

 Achille Marozzo, Opera Nova Chiamata Duello, O Vero Fiore dell'Armi de Singulari Abattimenti Offensivi, & Diffensivi1536
 Angelo Viggiani dal Montone, Trattato dello Schermo1575
 Anonimo Bolognese, L'Arte della Spada (M-345/M-346 Manuscripts)(early or mid 16th century) date it to "about 1550"
 Antonio Manciolino, Opera Nova per Imparare a Combattere, & Schermire d'ogni sorte Armi1531
 Bondi di Mazo, La Spada Maestra1696
 Camillo Agrippa, Trattato di Scientia d'Arme con un Dialogo di Filosofia1553
 Francesco Alfieri, La Scherma di Francesco Alfieri1640
 Francesco Antonio Marcelli, Regole della Scherma1686
 Giacomo di Grassi, Ragion di Adoprar Sicuramente l'Arme si da Offesa, come da Difesa1570
 Giovanni dall'Agocchie, Dell'Arte di Scrimia1572
 Giuseppe Morsicato Pallavicini, La Scherma Illustrata1670
 Marco Docciolini, Trattato in Materia di Scherma1601
 Nicoletto Giganti, Scola overo Teatro1606
 Ridolfo Capo Ferro, Gran Simulacro dell'Arte e dell'Uso della Scherma1610
 Salvator Fabris, De lo Schermo ovvero Scienza d'Armi1606

Spain 

 Girard Thibault, Academie de l'Espee, ou se demonstrant par Reigles mathematiques, sur le fondement Cercle Mysterieux (1630)
 Jerónimo Sánchez de Carranza, De la Filosofía de las Armas (1569)
 Luis Pacheco de Narváez, Libro de las Grandezas de la Espada (1599)

France 
 André Desbordes, Discours de la théorie et de la pratique de l'excellence des armes (1610)
 Charles Besnard, Le maistre d'arme liberal (1653)
 François Dancie, Discours des armes et methode pour bien tirer de l'espée et poignard (c.1610) and L'Espee de combat (1623)

England 
 Joseph Swetnam, The Schoole of the Noble and Worthy Science of Defence (1617)
 The Pallas Armata (1639)
 Vincentio Saviolo, His Practise 1595

Germany 

 Jakob Sutor, Künstliches Fechtbuch (1612)
 Joachim Meyer, Thorough Descriptions of the free Knightly and Noble Art of Fencing (1570)
 Johannes Georgius Bruchius (1671)
 Paulus Hector Mair, Opus Amplissimum de Arte Athletica (1542)

The classical fencing tradition 
Classical fencing schools claim to have inherited aspects of rapier forms in their systems. In 1885, fencing scholar Egerton Castle wrote "there is little doubt that the French system of fencing can be traced, at its origin, to the ancient Italian swordsmanship; the modern Italian school being of course derived in an uninterrupted manner from the same source." Castle went on to note that "the Italians have preserved the rapier form, with cup, pas d'ane, and quillons, but with a slender quadrangular blade."

Popular culture and entertainment 
 Despite the rapier's common usage in the 16th and 17th centuries, many films set in these periods (many starring Errol Flynn) have the swordsmen using épées or foils. Actual rapier combat was hardly the lightning thrust and parry depicted. Director Richard Lester and fight choreographer William Hobbs attempted to more closely match traditional rapier technique in The Three Musketeers and The Four Musketeers. Since then, many newer movies, like The Princess Bride and La Reine Margot have used rapiers rather than later weapons, although the fight choreography has not always accurately portrayed historical fencing techniques. Rapiers are also often featured in various video games, in particular role-playing games set in medieval- and Renaissance-inspired worlds.
 In the Redwall series, the rapier is the primary weapon of the Guosim shrews, though it is not exclusive to them.
 In JoJo's Bizarre Adventure, Polnareff's Stand, Silver Chariot, uses a rapier as its weapon.
 In X, the Sacred Swords used by Kamui Shiro and Fuma Monou both looks like a cross between a rapier and a longsword.
 In Magic Knight Rayearth, Umi Ryuuzaki uses a rapier-like magic sword.
 In Cardcaptor Sakura, the Sword card used by Sakura Kinomoto is both a depictional and a physical rapier.
 In Berserk, Serpico is a skilled fencer who wields a rapier. He also wields a feather duster-like magical rapier called the "Sylph Sword".
 In the television series Queen of Swords features the use of the rapier in the mysterious circle, Destreza style favoured by the first swordmaster of the series Anthony De Longis who studied the Spanish sword fighting technique and wanted a unique style for the heroine. He had previously used it in the episode, "Duende", of the Highlander: The Series. The hilt of the rapier was made by blade maker Dave Baker as were other swords used in the show.
 In Bleach, Sasakibe releases his Zanpakutō's Shikai in the form of a rapier's hand guard.
 In One Piece, Brook's signature weapon is a rapier concealed in a cane called "Soul Solid".
 In Sword Art Online, Asuna Yuuki uses rapiers as her primary weapon.
 In the web series RWBY, Weiss Schnee uses a rapier named "Myrtenaster", and Neopolitan conceals a rapier inside her parasol named "Hush".
 In Dota 2, there is an item called "Divine Rapier" and it has an immense damage capability given to the player who wields it.
 In most editions of Dungeons & Dragons, including the current 5th edition, the rapier is included as a weapon in the Player's Handbook.
In the 2015 spaceflight simulator Kerbal Space Program, a hybrid jet engine based on Skylon's SABRE is named "CR-7 R.A.P.I.E.R", referring the usage of the name of a sword in its real-life counterpart.
 In the Super NES version of Turtles in Time, a rapier was used by Rocksteady, a mutant rhinoceros thug when he dressed as a buccaneer captain.
 A rapier is the primary weapon of Captain Hook, the arch enemy for the title character of Peter Pan.
 A rapier is the primary weapon of the character Puss in Boots from the Dreamworks film Shrek 2 and other works by the company.
 In the video game series Azur Lane, the character Le Malin wields a rapier
 In the second season of the show Strike Witches, Perrine Clostermann (based on French fighter ace Pierre Clostermann) uses a rapier
 In Arknights, the character Irene dual-wields both a rapier and a hand-cannon.

See also 
 Estoc
 Historical European martial arts
 Oakeshott typology
 Spada da lato

References

Further reading 
 
 
 Leoni, Tom. The Art of Dueling: 17th Century Rapier as Taught by Salvatore Fabris. Highland Village, TX: The Chivalry Bookshelf, 2005.

External links 

Early Modern European swords
Historical fencing
Renaissance-era swords
Spanish inventions